Elisabeth Albertine of Anhalt-Dessau (1 May 1665 – 5 October 1706), was a German noblewoman by birth Princess of Anhalt-Dessau as member of the House of Ascania and by marriage Duchess of Saxe-Weissenfels-Barby.

Born in Cölln an der Spree, she was the fourth of ten children born from the marriage of John George II, Prince of Anhalt-Dessau and Henriette Catherine of Orange-Nassau. From her nine older and younger siblings, five survive adulthood: Henriette Amalie (by marriage Princess of Nassau-Dietz), Marie Eleonore (by marriage Princess Radziwiłł and Duchess of Olyka), Henriette Agnes, Leopold I, Prince of Anhalt-Dessau and Johanna Charlotte (by marriage Margravine of Brandenburg-Schwedt).

Life
In 1680, and thanks to her father's instigation, Elisabeth Albertine was chosen Princess-Abbess of Herford Abbey as Elisabeth IV, securing with this the support of the Rhenish Imperial College prelate (German: Reichsprälatenkollegiums). She remained in the post for six years, until her marriage was arranged and moved to Barby; however, several Herford artists and merchants followed her.

In Dessau on 30 March 1686, Elisabeth Albertine married Henry, Duke of Saxe-Weissenfels-Barby. Elisabeth Albertine's paternal great-great grandmother was Agnes of Barby-Mühlingen; this give to Henry some blood ties to the extinct House of Barby.

The marriage produced eight children, of whom only three survive adulthood:
John August, Hereditary Prince of Saxe-Weissenfels-Barby (Dessau, 28 July 1687 – Dessau, 22 January 1688).
John August, Hereditary Prince of Saxe-Weissenfels-Barby (Dessau, 24 July 1689 – Dessau, 21 October 1689).
Stillborn twin sons (Dessau, 1690).
Frederick Henry, Hereditary Prince of Saxe-Weissenfels-Barby (Dessau, 2 July 1692 – The Hague, 21 November 1711).
George Albert, Duke of Saxe-Weissenfels-Barby (Dessau, 19 April 1695 – Barby, 12 June 1739).
Henriette Marie (Dessau, 1 March 1697 – Weissenfels, 10 August 1719).
Stillborn daughter (Dessau, 5 October 1706).

Elisabeth Albertine died in Dessau aged 41, following complications in her last childbirth. She was buried in the Familiengruft, Barby.

References

|-
 

 

Elisabeth
Elisabeth Albertine
1665 births
1706 deaths
Elisabeth
Calvinist abbesses
Abbesses of Herford
⚭Princess Elisabeth Albertine of Anhalt-Dessau
Deaths in childbirth
Daughters of monarchs